The International Centre for Integrated Mountain Development (ICIMOD) is a regional intergovernmental learning and knowledge sharing centre serving the eight regional member countries (RMCs) of the Hindu Kush Himalaya (HKH) region – Afghanistan, Bangladesh, Bhutan, China, India, Myanmar, Nepal, and Pakistan. The HKH region is a vast area, encompassing mountain ranges stretching from the Hindu Kush range in northern Afghanistan to the Arakan range in Myanmar, with the Himalayan range as its spine, and also includes the Tibetan Plateau. ICIMOD promotes and fosters partnerships amongst the RMCs in an effort to secure a better future for the people and environment of the HKH region.

ICIMOD is headquartered at Khumaltar in the city of Lalitpur, which is located in the Kathmandu valley of Nepal. At Godavari in Lalitpur, ICIMOD has a Knowledge Park which exhibits some applications of ICIMOD's theoretical and field research. In addition, ICIMOD has country offices in Afghanistan and Pakistan. ICIMOD's partner organisations include national and international scientific institutions, government agencies, donor agencies, and the private sector, both in within the RMCs and outside.

Vision and mission
ICIMOD's vision is: "Men, women, and children of the Hindu Kush Himalayas enjoy improved well being in a healthy environment."

The organisation's mission is: "To enable sustainable and resilient mountain development for improved and equitable livelihoods through knowledge and regional cooperation."

ICIMOD's motto is "For mountains and people".

History

Origins 
The idea of creating an institution to promote the ecologically sound development of mountainous regions was discussed at the International Workshop on the Development of Mountain Environment in December 1974 in Munich, Germany, but it was only five years later in 1979 during a United Nations Educational, Scientific and Cultural Organisation (UNESCO) Regional Meeting in Kathmandu, under the framework of the Man and the Biosphere Programme, that concrete commitments were made to establish the centre. The Government of Nepal offered to host the new institution, and the Governments of Switzerland and the Federal Republic of Germany and UNESCO agreed to act as the founding sponsors. His Majesty's Government of Nepal and UNESCO signed the agreement that provided the legal basis for establishing the Centre in September 1981 in Paris. The centre was finally established and inaugurated on 5 December 1983 with its headquarters in Lalitpur, Nepal, and legitimised through an Act of Parliament in Nepal in the same year.

Headquarters 
For the first 20 years, i.e. from late 1983 till late 2004, ICIMOD was based at a rented premises in Jawalakhel, Lalitpur. On 5 December 2004, the 21st anniversary of ICIMOD, a new headquarters for ICIMOD was inaugurated by King Gyanendra of Nepal at Khumaltar, Lalitpur. The 1.5 hectares for this headquarters campus, worth over US$1 million, were contributed by the Government of Nepal. The governments of China and India contributed US$100,000 each, for the construction of the new headquarters. The government of Pakistan committed US$100,000 for its construction. The government of Bangladesh contributed US$28,300, including a Bangladesh pavilion in the campus. The government of Bhutan contributed in kind, in the form of a Bhutan pavilion in the campus. In the earthquake of 25 April 2015 in Nepal, the headquarters received minor damages, but the Bhutan pavilion completely collapsed. The pavilion was subsequently rebuilt and re-inaugurated in 2016.

Directors/Director Generals of ICIMOD 
Since its inception, ICIMOD has been headed by a Director General. The first head of ICIMOD, Prof. Kenneth Colin Rosser, was designated as the 'Director' of ICIMOD. All subsequent heads have been designated as the 'Director Generals' of ICIMOD. Following is a list of all the Director Generals of ICIMOD till the present:

 Prof. Kenneth Colin Rosser, from the United Kingdom (1984–1989)
 Dr. E.F. Tacke, from the Federal Republic of Germany (1989–1994)
 Mr. Egbert Pelinck, from the Netherlands (1994–2000)
 Dr. Gabriel Campbell, from the United States of America (2000–2007)
 Dr. Andreas Schild, from Switzerland (2007–2011)
 Dr. David Molden, from the United States of America (2011–2020)
 Dr. Pema Gyamtsho, from the Kingdom of Bhutan (2020–present)

Dr. Pema Gyamtsho from Bhutan is the first Director General from an ICIMOD regional member country.

Organisational structure

Board of Governors 
The highest governing body of ICIMOD is its Board of Governors, which consists of one high-ranking state official from each of its eight regional member countries, and independent members who are nominated by the ICIMOD Support Group based on their recognized professional expertise and experience. The ICIMOD Support Group consists of representatives from among the organizations and institutions that provide financial contributions to ICIMOD.

Funding 
The programmes and activities of ICIMOD are supported by long-term sponsors, who provide funding to the institution. These include the governments of all the eight RMCs, and the governments of Australia, Austria, Norway, Sweden, and Switzerland. Programme donors include the ADA (Austria), BMZ and BMU (Germany), the UK govt, the EU, SIDA (Sweden), IDRC (Canada), IFAD, the Norwegian Ministry of Foreign Affairs, and USAID.

Staff 
ICIMOD draws its core staff from a variety of backgrounds, including researchers, academics, development practitioners, professional in relevant fields, and bureaucrats on deputation. Over the years, the disciplinary backgrounds of its staff have exhibited a wide range, and have included various pure and applied natural sciences, social sciences and the humanities, and professional streams such as journalism and business studies. This interdisciplinary mix aims to holistically shape research and actions which are planned and implemented through ICIMOD's 'Regional Programmes'.

Regional Programmes 
With its large array of partner organisations, ICIMOD organizes its work in six 'Regional Programmes', each of which, in its own way, generates and brings together scientific knowledge, orients research into use, and thereby delivers impacts across areas essential to sustainable mountain development in the HKH region. These six regional programmes are 'Adaptation and Resilience Building', 'Transboundary Landscapes', 'River Basins and Cryosphere', 'Atmosphere', 'Mountain Environment Regional Information Systems', and 'Mountain Knowledge and Action Networks'. ICIMOD's Regional Programmes build on the organisation's long history of engagement in the RMCs. They are formulated to promote transboundary cooperation between the RMCs, meet the capacity-building needs in the region, and support long-term testing, piloting, and monitoring of innovative approaches in sustainable development and managing human-ecology interfaces.

Earth Observation Science at ICIMOD 
ICIMOD actively uses earth observation science and applications for environmental management, disaster risk reduction, and enhanced resilience in the HKH region. Several ICIMOD researchers are involved in their research in different topics of earth observation science. Among the different remote sensing work, the Regional Land Cover Monitoring System (RLCMS) is most mentionable as that provides a series of 30-m resolution annual land cover maps with harmonized land cover data for the years 2000–2018. These regional land cover maps are highly consistent and are designed to serve explicit user-defined objectives. Besides that, ICIMOD is involved in rapid mapping of flood inundation for the Koshi river basin, Bangladesh, Nepal, soil erosion and sedimentation yield spatial distribution and many more mapping activities for the regions.

Relevance 
A 2021 case study of ICIMOD from the World Bank by Aditya Valiathan Pillai comments on ICIMOD's role as an apolitical intergovernmental platform:

References

External links
 ICIMOD Homepage
 ICIMOD Publications

Himalayas
Montane ecology
Environmental organisations based in Nepal
Sustainable agriculture
Intergovernmental organizations
Forestry in Nepal
1983 establishments in Nepal
Think tanks based in Nepal
International organisations based in Nepal
Sustainable Development Goals
Climate change and society
Climate change and agriculture
Climate change and the environment
Climate change adaptation
UNESCO
Cryosphere
Hindu Kush
Climate change in Asia
Tibetan Plateau
Flood control in Asia
Foreign relations of Bangladesh
Foreign relations of Bhutan
Foreign relations of China
Foreign relations of India
Foreign relations of Myanmar
Foreign relations of Nepal
Foreign relations of Pakistan
Nature conservation in Asia
Traditional knowledge
Lalitpur District, Nepal
Climate change policy
Transboundary environmental issues
Earth science research institutes
Social science institutes
Multilateral relations
Science communication